Song of the Phoenix is a 2013 Chinese art house drama film directed by Wu Tianming. It was released in China by Beijing Juhe Yinglian Media on May 6, 2016.

Plot
In a Wushuang village, Shaanxi province, a young boy named You Tianming (Zheng Wei) begins to learn suona with Master Jiao (Tao Zeru). He and a fellow student, Lanyu (Hu Xianxu), dream of playing in Master Jiao's ensemble, which goes on tour throughout the Wushuang villages for wedding and funeral performances.

Master Jiao announces that he will soon retire, and he chooses Tianming as his successor. Jiao teaches Tianming the suona knowledge passed from teacher to student over the centuries. Tianming also learns the "Song of the Phoenix", a celebrated piece of music played only at funerals of the most renowned individuals.

When Tianming grows up (Li Mincheng), he becomes principal of the suona ensemble, but he finds the popularity of traditional Chinese music waning. The respect due to the suona musicians is no longer shown, and he is called to fewer and fewer gigs. To his anger, the use of suona is being replaced with the "modern" instruments of the West.

The company begins to disband as the ensemble's members must face reality and find work elsewhere to make ends meet. Master Jiao urges Tianming to continue the tradition of the suona ensemble, although he himself is compromised by a diagnosis of terminal lung cancer.

An official from the government arrives to ask Tianming to make a recording with his ensemble to preserve the culture of this dying art form. However, the few remaining members of the ensemble are unable to play, as they have sustained injuries from labour in factories. Lanyu suggests that Tianming also abandon life in the village and find work in the city. But Tianming remains devout to his teacher's greatest wish.

Upon Master Jiao's death, Tianming plays the "Song of the Phoenix" at the tombstone, alone.

Cast
Tao Zeru
Li Mincheng
Ji Bo
Zheng Wei
Hu Xianxu
Chi Peng
Yuan Zhongfang
Mo Yang
Zhang Xiqian
Tan Qun
Wang Changling
Zhou Tianyu
Zhang Shuangcheng
Xu Huanshan
Wang Fang

Reception
The film has grossed  at the Chinese box office.

References

External links

2013 drama films
2013 films
Chinese historical films
Chinese musical films
Films directed by Wu Tianming